The 1996 NCAA Division I baseball tournament was played at the end of the 1996 NCAA Division I baseball season to determine the national champion of college baseball.  The tournament concluded with eight teams competing in the College World Series, a double-elimination tournament in its fiftieth year.  Eight regional competitions were held to determine the participants in the final event.  Each region was composed of six teams, resulting in 48 teams participating in the tournament at the conclusion of their regular season, and in some cases, after a conference tournament.  The fiftieth tournament's champion was LSU, coached by Skip Bertman.  The Most Outstanding Player was Pat Burrell of Miami (FL).

Regionals
The opening rounds of the tournament were played across eight regional sites across the country, each consisting of a six-team field. Each regional tournament is double-elimination, however region brackets are variable depending on the number of teams remaining after each round. The winners of each regional advanced to the College World Series.

Bold indicates winner.

Atlantic Regional
Hosted by Clemson at Tiger Field in Clemson, South Carolina

Central I Regional
Hosted by Texas at Disch–Falk Field in Austin, Texas

Central II Regional
Hosted by Texas Tech at Dan Law Field in Lubbock, Texas

East Regional
Hosted by Florida at Alfred A. McKethan Stadium in Gainesville, Florida

Midwest Regional
Hosted by Wichita State at Eck Stadium in Wichita, Kansas

South I Regional
Hosted by Alabama at Sewell–Thomas Stadium in Tuscaloosa, Alabama

South II Regional
Hosted by Louisiana State at Alex Box Stadium in Baton Rouge, Louisiana

West Regional
Hosted by Stanford at Sunken Diamond in Stanford, California

College World Series
The championship game ended dramatically when LSU's Warren Morris hit a two-out, two-run home run against Miami reliever Robbie Morrison in the bottom of the ninth inning to lift the Bayou Bengals to a 9–8 victory over the Hurricanes. It was Morris's only home run of the 1996 season. Morris, an All-American in 1995, missed much of the 1996 season after suffering a wrist injury early in the campaign.

Oklahoma State's participation in CWS marked the last athletic event for the Big 8 Conference. The Big 8 was absorbed into the new Big 12 on July 1, 1996.

Participants

Results

Bracket

Game results

All-Tournament Team
The following players were members of the College World Series All-Tournament Team.

Notable players
 Alabama: Dustan Mohr, Tim Young
 Clemson: Kris Benson, Billy Koch, Matt LeCroy, Ken Vining
 Florida: David Eckstein, Mark Ellis, Josh Fogg, Paul Rigdon, Brad Wilkerson, Chuck Hazzard
 Florida State: Randy Choate, J. D. Drew
 LSU: Brett Laxton, Warren Morris, Ed Yarnall, Eddy Furniss
 Miami (FL): Pat Burrell, Alex Cora
 Oklahoma State: Dave Maurer, Brian Aylor
 Wichita State: Casey Blake, Braden Looper

Tournament notes 

 LSU's 29–13 victory over Georgia Tech sets a new tournament record for most combined runs (42).

References

NCAA Division I Baseball Championship
 
Baseball in Austin, Texas
Baseball in Lubbock, Texas
Events in Lubbock, Texas
Sports competitions in Texas